Agouticarpa is a genus of flowering plants in the family Rubiaceae. It was described by Claes Persson in 2003. The genus is found from Costa Rica to Bolivia.

Description 
Agouticarpa is characterized by being dioecious, having elliptic to obovate, membranaceous stipules, male flowers in a branched dichasial or thyrse-like inflorescence, a poorly developed cup-shaped calyx, pollen grains with 3-7 apertures, and large globose fruits.

Species 

 Agouticarpa curviflora (Dwyer) C.H.Perss. - Panama to Bolivia
 Agouticarpa grandistipula C.H.Perss. - Ecuador
 Agouticarpa hirsuta C.H.Perss. - Ecuador
 Agouticarpa isernii (Standl.) C.H.Perss. - Ecuador, Colombia, Peru
 Agouticarpa spinosa C.H.Perss. & Delprete - Peru
 Agouticarpa velutina C.H.Perss. - Ecuador, Peru
 Agouticarpa williamsii (Standl.) C.H.Perss. - Costa Rica, Panama, Colombia, Ecuador

References

External links 
 Agouticarpa in the World Checklist of Rubiaceae

Rubiaceae genera
Cordiereae
Flora of South America
Dioecious plants